Lerik  is the capital city of Lerik Rayon in the southern area of Azerbaijan not far from the Iran border. It is located in the Talysh Mountains, a northwestern subrange of the Alborz (Elburz) mountain range. The majority of the population is Talysh.

Gallery

History 
Lerik is considered one of the ancient settlements of Azerbaijan. There are imprints of ancient people who were living In the caves. Nowadays there are settlement imprints which belong to bronze-Neolithic ages.

Lerik became a center of Zuvand Region of Azerbaijan SSR. In 1930 this region was renamed as Lerik.

According to census back in 1939 main population of Lerik were talysh people.

Historical monuments 
One of the sightseeing  is Buzeir cave. In 19th century Jacques de Morgan has discovered the specimen of  human imprints belonging to Neolithic era. Professor Asadulla Jafarov has discovered an ancient settlement which belongs to paleolith era.

Population 
Lerik city population 1939 (approximately after 10 years of rename by Azerbaijan SSR):

Demographics now (according to 2009 census)

The vast majority of the city's population is talysh, the rest are azerbaijanis and other nationalities.

National reservation of  Zuvand 
National reservation of Zuvand was created in Lerik region to maintain the flora and fauna. The area of national reservation covers 40.3 hectares of land.  National academy has settled Botanical Research center, where active observations and researches are made. These forests are habitats for wolves, bears, foxes, wild cats, boars and other animals.

References

External links

World Gazetteer: Azerbaijan – World-Gazetteer.com

Populated places in Lerik District
Settled areas of Elburz